Cerrostrangalia is a genus of beetles in the family Cerambycidae, containing the following species:

 Cerrostrangalia herrerai Hovore & Chemsak, 2005
 Cerrostrangalia solisi Hovore & Chemsak, 2005

References

Lepturinae